The current Legislative Assembly is the 15th Assembly since the formation of Kerala. It was elected in the 2021 Kerala Legislative Assembly election. The Speaker is MA. N. Shamseer of CPI(M). The Deputy Speaker is Chittayam Gopakumar of CPI. The leader of the Assembly is Pinarayi Vijayan from CPI(M).The leader of opposition is V. D Satheesan. The Government Chief Whip is Dr. N Jayaraj of KCM.

Composition

Members of Legislative Assembly

References

 Legislators up to 2006
 http://klaproceedings.niyamasabha.org

Further reading

External links
 Kerala Lok Sabha Election 2019 Results Website

 niyamasabha.org
 Kerala Assembly Election 2016 Website
 Election Database
 klaproceedings.niyamasabha.org

 
2021 establishments in Kerala
Unicameral legislatures
Kerala MLAs 2021–2026